John F. Perry & Co.  (c. 1875 - c. 1883) was a music publisher in Boston, Massachusetts in the mid-19th century.

References

Images

External links

 Library of Congress. Sheet music:
 George Augustus D'Arcy by Charles H. Yale. Boston: Perry, John F., 1879.
  Early in de mornin'; The great Ethiopian patter-song, by Chas. H. Yale. Boston: Perry & Co., John F., 1881.

Music publishing companies of the United States
1875 establishments in Massachusetts
Economic history of Boston
19th century in Boston